The 2013 New Zealand bravery awards were announced via a Special Honours List on 2 December 2013.

New Zealand Bravery Decoration (NZBD)
For an act of exceptional bravery in a situation of danger:
Georgina Rose Langford.
Constable Michael Thomas Wardle – New Zealand Police.

New Zealand Bravery Medal (NZBM)
For an act of bravery:
Mark John Allen.
Kenneth William Reilly.
Jan Margaret Boyd.
John Boyd.
Detective Constable George Edward Ross Carter – New Zealand Police.
Constable James Phillip Collins – New Zealand Police.
Detective Constable Edward Michael Luxford – New Zealand Police.
Constable Johan Artemus Mulder – New Zealand Police.
Constable Liam Pham – New Zealand Police.
Sergeant Christopher Charles Turnbull – New Zealand Police.
Constable Andrew Stephen Warne – New Zealand Police.
Martin Joseph Kay.
Colin John Wiggins.
Lois Patricia Kennedy
Jade Ronald Lynn

References

New Zealand Royal Honours System
Bravery awards
Hon
New Zealand bravery awards